The GAMURS Group, simply known as Gamurs, is an esports media and entertainment publisher. Established in 2014, the group operates multiple brands focusing on the esports and entertainment news markets, including the websites: Dot Esports, We Got This Covered, The Mary Sue, and Prima Games. GAMURS is based out of Sydney, Australia, with an office in Austin, Texas.

History
In 2010, at the age of 14, Riad Chikhani and Phillip Luu established Rune Gear, an online portal for the game RuneScape. They sold the business at the age of 17 to focus on school. This portal motivated the pair to develop a similar business but for a wider variety of games, which later became the GAMURS Group.

GAMURS began as a social network for gamers after joining the NRMA Jumpstart program run by the Slingshot Accelerator. Shortly after the program ended, the company raised $500,000 in a seed round. GAMURS acquired two platforms, TeamFind and CSGOTeamFinder. On February 14, 2016, these sites merged to provide team and player-finding functionality for Counter-Strike: Global Offensive and League of Legends. GAMURS raised an additional $500,000 in another seed round in April 2016.

On April 26, 2016, GAMURS acquired esports publication websites eSports-Nation.com, GoldPer10, and eSports.guru. Once the acquisitions were completed, the three platforms were merged, making GAMURS a content provider for titles such as Call of Duty: Black Ops III, Halo 5: Guardians, Hearthstone, and Overwatch. On June 11, GAMURS launched EsportsWikis, an online encyclopedia dedicated to esports. On September 19, it acquired esports news outlet SplitPush.net. On October 28, GAMURS acquired Dot Esports from The Daily Dot.

On November 9, 2020, GAMURS acquired Pro Game Guides, a source for gaming guides. On June 28, 2021, GAMURS acquired We Got This Covered, a news site for film, TV, comics, and entertainment culture. On November 17, GAMURS acquired the website The Mary Sue, a website intended to highlight women in the geek culture space and provide a space for minority and underrepresented voices.

On January 3, 2022, GAMURS announced the acquisition of Prima Games, a gaming media company. On February 10, it announced the acquisition of Twinfinite, a website focused on video game news, reviews, features, and opinions. On September 30, it confirmed the acquisition of several websites from Enthusiast Gaming, including Destructoid, The Escapist, PC Invasion, and Siliconera.

References

ru:Gamurs
Entertainment companies established in 2014
Australian companies established in 2014
Internet properties established in 2014
2016 mergers and acquisitions
2020 mergers and acquisitions
2021 mergers and acquisitions
2022 mergers and acquisitions
Companies based in Sydney
Companies based in Austin, Texas
Esports websites
Video game websites